Genesee County is a county in the U.S. state of Michigan. As of the 2020 Census, the population was 406,211, making it the fifth-most populous county in Michigan. The county seat and population center is Flint (birthplace of General Motors). Genesee County is considered to be a part of the greater Mid Michigan area.

The county was named after Genesee County, New York, which in turn comes from the Seneca word Gen-nis'-hee-yo, meaning "Beautiful Valley". Genesee County comprises the Flint, MI Metropolitan Statistical Area. A major attraction for visitors is Crossroads Village, a living history village north of Flint.

Genesee County is noted for having had the fossil of an ancient whale known as Balaenoptera Lacepede unearthed in Thetford Township during quarry work and estimated at 11,000 years old.

History

Formative period
Genesee County was created on March 28, 1835, from territory taken from Lapeer, Shiawassee and Saginaw counties. The county was attached to Oakland County for judicial purposes. The only township organized at the time was Grand Blanc, formed in 1833 consisting of additional township areas of the present Fenton, Mundy, Flint, Mount Morris, Genesee, Burton, Atlas and Davison townships. (Atlas and Davision township survey areas were then in Lapeer County.) Flint Township followed in formation by the legislature on March 2, 1836, splitting away from Grand Blanc with the township areas of Burton, Genesee and Mount Morris plus additional township areas of the present day Clayton, Montrose, Flushing, Thetford and Vienna. On April 4, 1836, the county was fully organized. Organized on July 26, 1836, Argentine Township included two township survey areas taking Fenton away from Grand Blanc Township plus the current Argentine area west of Fenton.

In the organizing act of March 11, 1837, two townships (Mundy and Vienna) were organized in the county. Mundy had an additional township area to the west. Vienna consisted of the northern tier of three township areas in the county at the time taking two areas from Flint Township. With this act just a week after Michigan's admission as a state, the county was fully cover with 5  township governments.

The townships of Genesee, Fenton, and Flushing were formed on March 6, 1838. Genesee and Flushing were split off from Flint Township.  Fenton was split off from Argentine Township. Genesee included half the survey area to the west. While Flushing included the other half of that survey area (township 8 North range 6 East), the full township area further west (township 8 North range 5 East) then another survey area and half the row below (township 7 North range 5,6 East). Thus Flint Township consisted of one and a half township survey areas.

15 northerly sections of survey area Township No. 7 north of range No. 7 east in Flint Township plus southerly sections of Genesee Township was set off by the Michigan legislature as Kearsley Township in 1839. On March 7, 1843, the legislature abolished this township returning the sections back to Flint and Genesee Townships. Thus Flint Township consisted of approximately one and a half township survey areas.

Two new townships were formed by the state on March 9, 1842. Thetford was the east most survey area split off from Vienna. While Gaines was formed with the western township survey of Mundy.

The county was enlarged on March 9, 1843, by adding a column of townships on its east from Lapeer County. From north to south, the townships were Forest, Richfield, Davison and Atlas.

On March 25, 1846, an additional two townships were formed, Clayton and Pewanagawink. Clayton splitting the southernmost survey area off from Flushing Township. Pewanagawink took the westernmost survey area from Vienna and changed its name to Montrose by act of January 15, 1848.

Mt. Morris Township was created on February 12, 1855, from a single survey township area with its two halves taken from Flushing and Genesee Townships. Flint Township was split into three parts upon the formation of the City of Flint. The County Board of Supervisors split the remaining township survey area into two with the western area becoming Garland Township (this name only last until the Flint name was restored on February 5, 1856) and the remaining eastern survey area became Burton Township.

Modern era
Plans for the Genesee Recreation Area was placed in Flint's master plan in 1950. This was present to Charles Stewart Mott Foundation Board of Trustees in 1964 with C.S. Mott getting behind the plan. In 1968, the county park system was started with the purchase of vacant land. with funds from the Mott Foundation, with a stipulation that a parks commission be formed.

Flint Community Junior College was turned into a county-wide institution with a referendum and millage proposal passing the voters in 1969.  To reflect this, the college was renamed Genesee Community College on July 5, 1970. In 1973, it was renamed to Charles Stewart Mott Community College after the death of C.S. Mott.

In October 2009, County Commissioners directed County Corporate Counsel to discuss with the County Prosecuting Attorney a possible merger of his office with the County Prosecuting Attorney's Office. As of December 2011, County Counsel Ward Chapman was intending to retire by the end of the year raising the possibility again of a merger. By August 9, 2016, the two offices were merged.

Emergency Management & Homeland Security Department was merged by the County Commission into the Sheriff's Department in June 2010 with the department director position being demoted to a manager level post while eliminating a programming coordinator. In July 2010, the County Board voted to merge the clerk and register of deeds offices, effective January 1, 2013.

On October 26, 2010, Genesee County became a founding member of the Karegnondi Water Authority with Board of Commissioners Chair Jamie W. Curtis representing the County on the Authority Board.

On May 30, 2012, it was reported Genesee County has had 45 confirmed tornadoes since 1950 (most notably the 1953 Flint–Beecher tornado),  more than any other county in Michigan in that time period.

Geography

Most of the land in the county is very flat, but the southern end is hilly and covered by several lakes.

The county is mostly drained by the Flint River, which is dammed into Mott Lake and the Holloway Reservoir in the northeast corner of the county. The southeast corner and southern end are drained by the Shiawassee River.

Adjacent counties
 Tuscola County (northeast)
 Lapeer County (east)
 Oakland County (southeast)
 Livingston County (southwest)
 Shiawassee County (west)
 Saginaw County (northwest)

Transportation
 Bishop International Airport is served by several major airlines.
 The inter-modal Flint Amtrak station offers daily service on the Blue Water route west to Chicago and east to Port Huron. It doubles as a bus station for Greyhound Lines, Indian Trails and Flint Mass Transportation Authority.

Major highways
  - runs north and south through central Genesee County, merges with US 23 in Mundy Township
  - runs north and south through central Genesee County, merges with I-75 in Mundy Township
  - alternate route of I-75/US23, runs north and south through central Genesee County
  - runs north and south through central Genesee County
  - runs north and south through western Genesee County, along the borders with Shiawassee County and Saginaw County and north of I-69
  - runs north and south through eastern Genesee County
  - runs east and west through central Genesee County
  - runs east and west through central Genesee County, west of I-475
  - runs east and west through northern Genesee County, west of M-15

Demographics

The 2010 United States Census indicates Genesee County had a 2010 population of 425,790. This is a decrease of 10,351 people from the 2000 United States Census. Overall, the county had a -2.4% growth rate during this ten-year period. In 2010 there were 169,202 households and 111,620 families in the county. The population density was 668.5 per square mile (258.1 square kilometers). There were 192,180 housing units at an average density of 301.7 per square mile (116.5 square kilometers). 74.5% of the population were White, 20.7% Black or African American, 0.9% Asian, 0.5% Native American, 0.7% of some other race and 2.6% of two or more races. 3.0% were Hispanic or Latino (of any race). 18.0% were of German, 11.0% Irish, 10.6% English, 5.5% Polish 5.4% American and 4.8% French ancestry.
,
There were 169,202 households, out of which 32.6% had children under the age of 18 living with them, 43.3% were husband and wife families, 17.2% had a female householder with no husband present, 34.0% were non-families, and 28.4% were made up of individuals. The average household size was 2.48 and the average family size was 3.03.

In the county, 25.0% of the population was under the age of 18, 8.9% from 18 to 24, 24.7% from 25 to 44, 27.6% from 45 to 64, and 13.7% was 65 years of age or older. The median age was 39 years. For every 100 females, there were 93.1 males. For every 100 females age 18 and over, there were 89.4 males.

The 2010 American Community Survey 1-year estimate  indicates the median income for a household in the county was $38,819 and the median income for a family was $48,979. Males had a median income of $27,269 versus $18,082 for females. The per capita income for the county was $19,860. About 16.9% of families and 21.0% of the population were below the poverty line, including 31.0% of those under the age 18 and 6.3% of those age 65 or over.

Government and politics

Genesee County is a Democratic stronghold. It has only voted for a Republican candidate five times since 1932. The county, however, has shifted to the right in recent elections, with the Democrats carrying it by less than 10 points in both 2016 and 2020. It last voted for a Republican in 1984.

The county government operates the jail, maintains rural roads, operates the major local courts, keeps files of deeds and mortgages, maintains vital records, administers public health regulations and safeguards public health, and participates with the state in the provision of welfare and other social services. The county board of commissioners controls the budget but has only limited authority to make laws or ordinances.  In Michigan, most local government functions—police and fire, building and zoning, tax assessment, street maintenance, etc.—are the responsibility of individual cities and townships.

The Genesee County Road Commission, an independent county government unit, is head of a five-member Road Commission. Road Commissioners are appointed by the County Board of Commissioners with the daily management is handled by a manager-director.

Genesee County, except for the City of Flint, is under the jurisdiction of the 67th District Court of Michigan. District Courts have a limited jurisdiction as charged under state law. The 67th District Court operates in seven divisions, each with a single judge except for the Central Court Division, which is used for jury and felony cases.

Genesee County is a founding member of the Karegnondi Water Authority The "outcounty" area (all but the city of Flint) receives library services from the Genesee District Library. The county equivalent for school is the Genesee Intermediate School District, which consist of school districts considered primarily within Genesee County. Charles Stewart Mott Community College is the local community college serving the same area as the GISD.
 Flint Area Narcotics Group is a Genesee County area anti-drug units head by the Michigan State Police consisting of 17 local members, some of whom loan police officers and resources to the group.
 Genesee Auto-Theft Investigation Network (GAIN) is a Genesee County Sheriff Department led anti-auto theft task forces with local government members.

Elected officials

 Probate Court Judges
 Jennie E. Barkey, chief
 F. Kay Behm

Recreation
The county has a park system headed by a Parks and Recreation Commission and a director appointed by the county board of commissioners recommended by the parks commission. Commission president is Joe Krapohl with Barry June as acting director.

In 1968, the county park system was started with the purchase of vacant land with funds from the Charles Stewart Mott Foundation, with a stipulation that a parks commission be formed.

In January 2018, Genesee County Parks & Recreation purchased land along the Kearsley Creek for $700,000 from the Poulos family, owners of the White Horse Tavern in Flint, with assistance from a Michigan Natural Resources Trust Fund grant. The new Atlas County Park opened on April 29, 2018.

Parks and other venues in the county system totaling 11,500 acres are:
 Buell Lake Park, Thetford Township, fishing site, picnic area, playground, ball diamond, picnic pavilions to rent, snowmobile area and radio-controlled model airplane field
 Davison Roadside Park, Burton, picnic area and beginner sledding hill
 Flushing County Park, Flushing  Township, picnic pavilions, ball diamond, playgrounds, tennis courts, cross country ski trails
 Holloway Reservoir Regional Park, Richfield and Oregon townships, 5,500 acres, canoe launch below Holloway Reservoir Dam, Walleye Pike Boat Launch
 Buttercup Beach
 Elba Equestrian Complex
 Hogback Hills, snowmobile area and sledding/tobogganing
 Wolverine Campground
 Linden County Park, Fenton Township, picnic pavilions, playgrounds, ball diamond, snowmobile area, intermediate sledding, toboggan hill and walking trails
 Clover Beach on Byram Lake
 Richfield County Park, Richfield Township, ball diamonds, bicycle-motocross track, canoe-launching site, cross-country ski trails, picnic pavilions, playgrounds, snowmobile area, tennis courts and walking trails
 Goldenrod Disc Golf Course, Richfield  Township, 18-basket disc golf course.
 Genesee Recreation Area on Mott Lake, Township
 Bluebell Beach and Splash Pad
 For-Mar Nature Preserve and Arboretum, Burton
 Atlas County Park, Hegel Road in Atlas Township
 Crossroads Village and Huckleberry Railroad
 Stepping Stones Falls - has a trail that connects to the Flint River Trail

Genesee County is the only one in Michigan without a state park.

Communities

Cities

 Burton
 Clio
 Davison
 Fenton (partial)
 Flint (county seat)
 Flushing
 Grand Blanc
 Linden
 Montrose
 Mount Morris
 Swartz Creek

Villages
 Gaines
 Goodrich
 Lennon (partial)
 Otisville
 Otter Lake (partial)

Charter townships

 Clayton Charter Township
 Fenton Charter Township
 Flint Charter Township
 Flushing Charter Township
 Genesee Charter Township
 Grand Blanc Charter Township
 Montrose Charter Township
 Mount Morris Charter Township
 Mundy Charter Township
 Vienna Charter Township

Civil townships
 Argentine Township
 Atlas Township
 Davison Township
 Forest Township
 Gaines Township
 Richfield Township
 Thetford Township

Census-designated places
 Argentine
 Beecher
 Lake Fenton

Other unincorporated communities

 Argentine
 Atlas
 Bayport Park
 Beecher
 Brent Creek
 Duffield
 Farrandville
 Genesee
 Huntingtown
 Kipp Corners
 Lake Fenton
 Lakeside
 Pine Run
 Rankin
 Richfield Center
 Rogersville
 Russellville
 Thetford Center
 Whigville
 Whitesburg

Education
Public school districts include:
 Atherton Community Schools
 Beecher Community School District
 Bendle Public Schools
 Bentley Community Schools
 Birch Run Area School District
 Brandon School District
 Byron Area Schools
 Carman-Ainsworth Community School District
 Clio Area School District
 Davison Community Schools
 Durand Area Schools
 Fenton Area Public Schools
 Flint City School District
 Flushing Community Schools
 Genesee School District
 Goodrich Area Schools
 Grand Blanc Community Schools
 Kearsley Community Schools
 Lake Fenton Community Schools
 Lakeville Community Schools
 Linden Community Schools
 Millington Community Schools
 Montrose Community Schools
 Mount Morris Consolidated School District
 Swartz Creek Community Schools
 Westwood Heights Schools

There is a state-operated school: Michigan School for the Deaf (MSD).

In 1994 the Michigan School for the Blind moved back to Flint with MSD when the blind school's Lansing campus closed.

See also

 Back to the Bricks
 List of Michigan State Historic Sites in Genesee County, Michigan
 National Register of Historic Places listings in Genesee County, Michigan
 The Flint Enquirer

References

External links
 
 Genesee County Road Commission Official website
 Clarke Historical Library, Central Michigan University, Bibliography on Genesee County

 
Michigan counties
1836 establishments in Michigan Territory
Populated places established in 1836